The 2016–17 season was the 139th year in the history of English football club Wolverhampton Wanderers. The club competed in the second tier of the English football system, the Football League Championship for a third consecutive year.

This was the first season for the club under the ownership of the Chinese investment group Fosun which acquired the club on 21 July 2016 for a reported £45 million. Although head coach Kenny Jackett's position was initially confirmed by the new owners, he was replaced by Walter Zenga before the season proper began. However, Zenga lasted just 14 league games before being dismissed with the team in 18th place.

Paul Lambert was appointed on 5 November, but despite leading the team to two victories away at Premier League opposition in the FA Cup, the club's league form showed only a marginal improvement in the form of a 15th-place finish, one place lower than the previous campaign (although with an identical points tally of 58).

Following an internal review of the season, it was announced on 30 May that the club had decided to relieve Lambert of his position.

Results

Pre-season

Football League Championship

A total of 24 teams competed in the Football League Championship in the 2016–17 season. Each team played every other team twice, once at their stadium, and once at the opposition's. Three points were awarded to teams for each win, one point per draw, and none for defeats.

The provisional fixture list was released on 22 June 2016, but was subject to change in the event of matches being selected for television coverage or police concerns.

Results summary

Results by round

League table

FA Cup

EFL Cup

EFL Trophy

Wolves were one of the sixteen teams from outside the bottom two divisions of the Football League to be invited to field their academy team in the competition due to it holding Category 1 academy status. They were drawn in Group B in the Northern section.

Players

Statistics

|-
|align="left"|||align="left"|||align="left"| 
|||0||||0||0||0||||0||0||0||
|-
|align="left"|||align="left"|||align="left"| 
|||4||||1||||0||||5||4||0||
|-
|align="left"|||align="left"|||align="left"| 
|||0||0||0||||0||style="background:#98FB98"|||0||2||0||
|-
|align="left"|||align="left"|||align="left"| 
|||10||||0||||0||||10||9||0||
|-
|align="left"|||align="left"|||style="background:#faecc8; text-align:left;"|  ‡
|||0||||1||0||0||||1||2||0||
|-
|align="left"|||align="left"|||align="left"|  (c)
|||4||0||0||||0||||4||11||0||
|-
|align="left"|||align="left"|||align="left"|  ¤
|||0||0||0||||0||||0||0||0||
|-
|align="left"|||align="left"|||align="left"|  
|||1||||0||||0||||1||7||0||
|-
|align="left"|||align="left"|FW||align="left"| 
|||3||||0||0||0||||3||2||0||
|-
|align="left"|10||align="left"|FW||align="left"| 
|||3||||0||||1||||4||0||0||
|-
|align="left"|11||align="left"|||align="left"| 
|||0||0||0||0||0||||0||0||0||
|-
|align="left"|12||align="left"|||align="left"|  ¤
|||0||0||0||||1||||1||1||0||
|-
|align="left"|13||align="left"|||align="left"|  ¤
|0||0||0||0||0||0||0||0||0||0||
|-
|align="left"|14||align="left"|||align="left"| 
|||0||||0||||0||||0||2||0||
|-
|align="left"|15||align="left"|||style="background:#faecc8; text-align:left;"|  ‡¤
|||0||0||0||||0||style="background:#98FB98"|||0||0||0||
|-
|align="left"|16||align="left"|||align="left"| 
|||0||2||0||||1||||1||8||0||
|-
|align="left"|17||align="left"|||style="background:#faecc8; text-align:left;"|  ‡
|||10||||1||||1||style="background:#98FB98"|||12||3||0||
|-
|align="left"|18||align="left"|||align="left"| 
|||0||||0||||0||||0||4||1||
|-
|align="left"|19||align="left"|||align="left"| 
|||0||||0||||0||||0||7||0||
|-
|align="left"|20||align="left"|||align="left"|  ¤
|||2||0||0||||0||style="background:#98FB98"|||2||0||0||
|-
|align="left"|21||align="left"|||align="left"| 
|||0||0||0||||0||style="background:#98FB98"|||0||0||0||
|-
|align="left"|22||align="left"|FW||align="left"| 
|||3||||0||||0||style="background:#98FB98"|||3||3||0||
|-
|align="left"|23||align="left"|||align="left"|  ¤
|0||0||0||0||0||0||0||0||0||0||
|-
|align="left"|24||align="left"|||style="background:#faecc8; text-align:left;"|  ‡
|||2||0||0||||0||style="background:#98FB98"|||2||3||0||
|-
|align="left"|25||align="left"|||align="left"|  †
|0||0||0||0||0||0||0||0||0||0||
|-
|align="left"|25||align="left"|FW||align="left"| 
|||0||0||0||||0||style="background:#98FB98"|||0||0||0||
|-
|align="left"|26||align="left"|FW||align="left"| 
|||0||||0||0||0||||0||1||0||
|-
|align="left"|27||align="left"|||align="left"| 
|||0||||0||0||0||style="background:#98FB98"|||0||8||0||
|-
|align="left"|28||align="left"|||align="left"|  ¤
|0||0||0||0||0||0||0||0||0||0||
|-
|align="left"|29||align="left"|||style="background:#faecc8; text-align:left;"|  ‡
|||0||0||0||||0||style="background:#98FB98"|||0||2||0||
|-
|align="left"|30||align="left"|||align="left"| 
|||2||||0||||0||||2||2||0||
|-
|align="left"|31||align="left"|||align="left"|  ¤
|||0||1||0||0||0||style="background:#98FB98"|||0||1||0||
|-
|align="left"|34||align="left"|FW||align="left"| 
|||0||||0||0||0||style="background:#98FB98"|||0||0||0||
|-
|align="left"|43||align="left"|||align="left"| 
|||0||||0||0||0||style="background:#98FB98"|||0||0||0||
|-
|align="left"|48||align="left"|||align="left"| 
|0||0||0||0||0||0||0||0||0||0||
|-
|align="left"|50||align="left"|||align="left"| 
|||5||0||0||0||0||style="background:#98FB98"|||5||4||1||
|-
|align="left"|55||align="left"|||align="left"| 
|||0||||0||0||0||style="background:#98FB98"|||0||0||0||
|-
|align="left"|60||align="left"|||align="left"| 
|||0||||0||0||0||||0||1||1||
|-
|align="left"|63||align="left"|||style="background:#faecc8; text-align:left;"|  ‡
|||2||2||1||0||0||style="background:#98FB98"|||3||4||0||
|-
|align="left"|64||align="left"|||align="left"| 
|||2||0||0||0||0||style="background:#98FB98"|||2||1||0||
|}

Awards

Transfers

In

Out

Loans in

Loans out

References

2016–17 EFL Championship by team
2016-17